National Innovative Centre was a state school located in Islev, Denmark. The school was established in 1964 by Danish education minister K. Helveg Petersen to develop teaching innovations, and share the results of their work with schools across Denmark. The school had to close in 2007 due to political conflicts. The students were representative selected to reflect a common school class.

References

External links 
Nuværende ejere af ejendommene

Schools in Denmark
Educational institutions established in 1964
1964 establishments in Denmark